Nikiski High School is a public high school in the Kenai Peninsula Borough School District located in Nikiski, Alaska.

The school population is approximately 400 students in grades 6-12 and it is classified as a 3A school by the Alaska School Activities Association.

Nikiski High School offers football, volleyball, cross-country, wrestling, basketball, soccer, baseball, cross-country skiing, track and field, dance troupe, and DDF (drama, debate, and forensics). The football team were state champions in 2011.

See also
 List of high schools in Alaska

References

External links
 Official Site

Public high schools in Alaska
Schools in Kenai Peninsula Borough, Alaska